Johann Jakob Biedermann (August 7, 1763 – April 10, 1830) was a Swiss painter and etcher.

Beidermann was born in Winterthur, and initially instructed by Johann Rudolph Schellenberg and Heinrich Rieter in Bern. He primarily painted landscapes and portraits. Beidermann traveled to many European locations including Zurich, Paris, Frankfurt, Basel and Konstanz where he got his inspiration. He died in Zurich in 1830.

References
 This article was initially translated from the German Wikipedia.
 Carl Wilhelm hard Meier:  The life of the Kunstmahlers Johann Jakob conventional man of Winterthur . Zurich, 1835
  J.J. Biedermann 1763–1830: Memory exhibition in the museum Winterthur from September 7,  – October 5, 1930 . Museum Winterthur, 1930. * Rudolf Hunziker (Hrsg.):  Letters of the painter Johann Jakob conventional man at Ulrich Hegner . Winterthur: Buchdr. Winterthur, 1936
 Marie Louise Schaller:  Approach to nature: Swiss small master in Berne 1750–1800 . Berne: Stämpfli, 1990.

External links

 

Swiss landscape painters
18th-century Swiss painters
18th-century Swiss male artists
Swiss male painters
19th-century Swiss painters
1763 births
1830 deaths
19th-century Swiss male artists